Oleúde José Ribeiro (born 19 September 1966), known as Capitão, is a Brazilian former professional footballer who played as a defensive midfielder for several Série A clubs.

Career
Born in Conselheiro Pena, he started his professional career in 1986, defending Cascavel, leaving the club two years later to play for Portuguesa. After leaving Lusa in 1993, Capitão was transferred to Japan, where he defended Verdy Kawasaki in 1994. He had his second stint with Portuguesa from 1995 to 1997, helping the club finish as the 1996 Série A runner-up. Capitão won the 1998 Campeonato Paulista with São Paulo, and the 1999 Campeonato Gaúcho with Grêmio. After playing for Guarani and Portuguesa Santista, in 2000, and for Botafogo-SP and Sport respectively in 2001 and in 2002, he returned to Portuguesa, retiring in 2004.

Club statistics

Honors
Grêmio
Campeonato Gaúcho: 1999

São Paulo
Campeonato Paulista: 1998

References

External links

1966 births
Living people
Brazilian footballers
Associação Portuguesa de Desportos players
J1 League players
Tokyo Verdy players
São Paulo FC players
Grêmio Foot-Ball Porto Alegrense players
Guarani FC players
Associação Atlética Portuguesa (Santos) players
Botafogo Futebol Clube (SP) players
Sport Club do Recife players
Brazilian expatriate footballers
Expatriate footballers in Japan
Association football midfielders